In statistics, the Fisher–Tippett–Gnedenko theorem (also the Fisher–Tippett theorem or the extreme value theorem) is a general result in extreme value theory regarding asymptotic distribution of extreme order statistics. The maximum of a sample of iid random variables after proper renormalization can only converge in distribution to one of 3 possible distributions, the Gumbel distribution, the Fréchet distribution, or the Weibull distribution. Credit for the extreme value theorem and its convergence details are given to Fréchet (1927), Fisher and  Tippett (1928), Mises (1936) and Gnedenko (1943).

The role of the extremal types theorem for maxima is similar to that of central limit theorem for averages, except that the central limit theorem applies to the average of a sample from any distribution with finite variance, while the Fisher–Tippet–Gnedenko theorem only states that if the distribution of a normalized maximum converges, then the limit has to be one of a particular class of distributions. It does not state that the distribution of the normalized maximum does converge.

Statement

Let  be a sequence of independent and identically-distributed random variables with cumulative distribution function . Suppose that there exist two sequences of real numbers  and  such that the following limits converge to a non-degenerate distribution function:
,
or equivalently:

.

In such circumstances, the limit distribution  belongs to either the Gumbel, the Fréchet or the Weibull family.

In other words, if the limit above converges,  will assume the form:

or else

for some parameter  This is the cumulative distribution function of the generalized extreme value distribution (GEV) with extreme value index . The GEV distribution groups the Gumbel, Fréchet and Weibull distributions into a single one. Note that the second formula (the Gumbel distribution) is the limit of the first as  goes to zero.

Conditions of convergence

Also let  be the populational maximum, i.e. .

This corresponds to what is called a heavy tail.

Examples

Fréchet distribution
For the Cauchy distribution

the cumulative distribution function is:

and we have

Thus we have

and letting  (and skipping some explanation)

Gumbel distribution
Let us take the normal distribution with cumulative distribution function

We have

and

Thus we have

If we define  as the value that satisfies

then around 

As  increases, this becomes a good approximation for a wider and wider range of  so letting  we find that

Equivalently, 

We can see that  and then

so the maximum is expected to climb ever more slowly toward infinity.

Weibull distribution
We may take the simplest example, a uniform distribution between 0 and 1, with cumulative distribution function

 from 0 to 1.

Approaching 1 we have

Then

Letting  we have

See also
 Extreme value theory
 Gumbel distribution
 Generalized extreme value distribution
 Pickands–Balkema–de Haan theorem
Generalized Pareto distribution
Exponentiated generalized Pareto distribution

Notes

Theorems in statistics
Extreme value data
Tails of probability distributions